Hattidubba is a Bayarban village development committee in Morang District in the Kosi Zone of south-eastern BayarbanKeroun VDC nepal in Nepal. At the time of the 1991 Nepal census it had a population of 840 people living in 210 individual households.

References

Kanepokhari Rural Municipality